Whalley Seath Stranach (22 August 1886, Durban-17 January 1966, Durban) was a South African Rugby player who toured Argentina with the Combined British team in 1910. Stranach was a dentist who qualified at Guy's Hospital in 1912. He played for Guy's, Kings and St Thomas' Rugby Football Club. He also played for Barbarians and Kent.

Family life
Whalley was a descendant of the Stranacks of Margate, the son of William Stranack and Elizabeth Jane Spencer. Whalley married Mabel Clare in Marylebone in 1916, whom he divorced, remarrying Vivienne Strelitzia Royston on 7 February 1931 in Durban, Natal, South Africa. They had one son, John Seath Stranack, who emigrated to the United States.

References

1880s births
1966 deaths
Rugby union forwards
British & Irish Lions rugby union players from South Africa
Rugby union players from Durban